Police/Worlds: Studies in Security, Crime and Governance is a monograph series under the imprint of Cornell University Press. It is edited by Kevin Karpiak, Sameena Mulla, William Garriott, and Ilana Feldman; its acquisitions editor is Jim Lance.

Description 
It has as its goal to find and publish manuscripts that "develop new conceptual, aesthetic and critical insights into policing that can push debates—and, ultimately, ways of addressing social problems—beyond existing works in police studies, criminology and anthropology".

As of January 2021, the series consists of six published monographs: Sentiment, Reason, and Law: Policing in the Republic of China on Taiwan by Jeffrey T. Martin (2019); Policing the Frontier: An Ethnography of Two Worlds in Niger by Mirco Göpfert (2020); and Black Lives and Spatial Matters: Policing Blackness and Practicing Freedom in Suburban St. Louis by Jodi Rios (2020); From Family to Police Force Security and Belonging on a South Asian Border by Farhana Ibrahim (2021); Police, Provocation, Politics: Counterinsurgency in Istanbul by Deniz Yonucu (2022); and Unmaking Migrants: Nigeria's Campaign to End Human Trafficking by Stacey Vanderhurst (2022).

References

Policing journals
Ethnic studies journals
Cornell University Press books